The Unexplainable Disappearance of Mars Patel is a children's audio drama and science fiction podcast produced by Blobfish Radio, Gen-Z Media, and Pinna.fm Network. The show won a Peabody Award in 2016 and was later adapted into books and optioned for a television show.

Background 
The show was produced by Blobfish Radio, Gen-Z Media, and Pinna.fm Network. The voice actors for the main characters are played by middle school children. According to The New York Times, the appropriate age audience for the show is eight to twelve years old. The show originally debuted in 2016, but the episodes were re-released in 2021.

The podcast is a mystery that follows an eleven year old Indian boy named Manu "Mars" Patel and his friends Caddie Pratchett, JP McGowan, and Randall "Toothpick" Lee as they investigate the disappearance of their friends Aurora Gershowitz and Jonas Hopkins. The protagonists suspect that a technology business magnate named Oliver Pruitt is responsible for the disappearances. Throughout the story the characters piece together clues from various mediums such as emails, newspapers, instant messages, and transcripts. Mars Patel and his friends eventually travel to the planet Mars to investigate Oliver Pruitt's space colony.

Cast and characters 

 Jaiya Chetram as Manu "Mars" Patel
 Natalie Mehl as Caddie Pratchett
 Kate Wolfson as JP McGowan
 Wyatt Ralff as Randall "Toothpick" Lee
 Carter Minor as Jonas Hopkins
 Rileigh McDonald as Julia
 Mairead O'Neil as Aurora Gershowitz
 Brandon Simms as Orion
 Shane Epstein-Petrullo as Axel
 Courtney Chu as Daisy
 Fiona Kreizman as Epica
 Michael Perilstein as Oliver Pruitt
 Lipica Shah as Saira Patel
 Ilana Ransom-Toeplitz as The Computer
 Charlie Pollock as Mr. Q

Reception 
Melissa Locker of The Guardian, praised the show saying that it was an "adventurous kids podcast, reminiscent of old-time radio dramas." Amanda Hess of The New York Times called the show "the 'Serial' of children's podcasts." Steve Greene of IndieWire praised the show, saying that it was a "mystery investigation with just the right dash of whimsy and a healthy dose of scientific curiosity baked into it."

The show has similar themes to the Netflix original television show called Stranger Things.

The show was used as an educational aid in Warren Township Schools classrooms.

Awards

Adaptions 
The book series was written by children's author Sheela Chari and published by Walker Books. The first book is a 287 page adaption of the first season of the podcast, which was published on October 6, 2020. The second book is a 304 page adaption of the second season of the podcast, which was published on October 12, 2021.

The show was optioned for a Disney+ television show.

See also 

 List of children's podcasts
 List of science fiction podcasts

References

External links 
 
Audio podcasts
2016 podcast debuts
2021 podcast endings
Science fiction podcasts
Children's podcasts
Podcasts adapted for other media